"Schön wie Mona Lisa (Wenn ich ein Maler wär')" is a song by Greek singer Demis Roussos. It was first released as a single in 1975 on Philips Records.

Later it was included on Roussos' 1976 German-language album Die Nacht und der Wein.

Background and writing 
The song was written by Klaus Munro, Ralf Arnie, and Leo Leandros. The recording was produced by Leo Leandros.

Commercial performance 
The song reached no. 6 in Germany.

Track listing 
7" single Philips 6009 555 (November 1974, Germany, Austria)
 A. "Schön wie Mona Lisa (Wenn ich ein Maler wär')" (3:59)
 B. "Wind Wind" (3:23)

Charts

References

External links 

 Demis Roussos — "Schön wie Mona Lisa (Wenn ich ein Maler wär')" at Discogs

1975 songs
1975 singles
Demis Roussos songs
Philips Records singles
Songs written by Leo Leandros

Song recordings produced by Leo Leandros